The St. Mary's Seahawks are the intercollegiate athletic teams of St. Mary's College of Maryland, located in St. Mary's City, Maryland, that they are members in the Division III level of the National Collegiate Athletic Association (NCAA), primarily competing in the United East Conference (UEC; known before July 2021 as the North East Athletic Conference) for most of their sports since the 2021–22 academic year.; except for rowing, which they compete in the Mid-Atlantic Rowing Conference (MARC); and for sailing, which they compete in the Middle Atlantic Intercollegiate Sailing Association (MAISA) within the Inter-Collegiate Sailing Association (ICSA).

The Seahawks previously competed in the Coast to Coast Athletic Conference (C2C; known before November 2020 as the Capital Athletic Conference) from 1989–90 to 2020–21.

St. Mary's College of Maryland has the highest percentage of student-athletes on the C2C All-Academic team for 6 years in a row.

Varsity teams 

The most recent additions are both men's and women's track and field, which the university decided in 2020 to add.

Sailing 

St. Mary's College has three different sailing teams on campus, as well as a sailing club, and a windsurfing club. The Varsity Sailing Team and Offshore Sailing Team both compete in intercollegiate events around the country and occasionally in international regattas held in venues such as Europe. The Keelboat Sailing Team competes in racing events held by One Design or PHRF (Handicap) organizations in the Chesapeake Bay and other East Coast locations.

Sailing fleet 
Keelboats
Farr 40 "Yellow Jacket" 
Donovan 27 "Remedy" 
Beneteau 49 "Riptide"
C&C 35 Mk III "Connemara" 
C&C 30 "Blue Skies" 
2 sonars 
11 motorboats
Dinghies
 36 Flying Juniors
 18 420s 
 2 Larks
 2 Lasers
Wind surfing
The college has many racing-outfitted windsurfers.

Accomplishments 

Drawing on students from many Chesapeake Bay communities, St. Mary's College of Maryland is one of the top-ranked varsity sailing schools in the nation.

Awards and titles include:

 St. Mary’s College of Maryland sailing team currently holds 13 national titles.
 Sailing team has produced more than 135 ICSA All-American sailors, a college sailor of the year and a women’s college sailor of the year.
 Four Olympic sailors- one of whom earned a silver medal at the Olympics. 
 In 2006, the women's team won the Atlantic Coast Championship, defeating many venerable schools, including Harvard, Yale, Georgetown, and the U.S. Naval Academy.
 The co-ed and women's teams have been ranked first in the nation by Sailing World Magazine for the past two years. 
 In 2004, the College won the annual Inter-Collegiate Sailing Association (ICSA)/Layline North American Team Race Championship. 
 St. Mary's graduate Scott Steele (Class of '81) won the silver medal for windsurfing in the Olympics.

Basketball 
 17 NCAA Division III athletic teams (9 in women's sports, 8 in men's sports).
The St. Mary's College Men's basketball team has been a notable team since the 2007–08 season, winning the Capitol Athletic Conference title 5 times, and making 5 NCAA Division III tournament appearances, including reaching the Sweet 16 in 2008 and 2010, and the Elite 8 in 2011 and 2013.
 In the spring of 2008, St. Mary's Men's Basketball team was ranked 24th in the nation after making an appearance at the 2007–2008 NCAA Division III men's basketball tournament.

References

External links 
Official website